Irserbach (also: Irsenbach, Scharfenbach) is a river of Rhineland-Palatinate and North Rhine-Westphalia, Germany. It flows into the Sieg near Windeck.

See also
List of rivers of Rhineland-Palatinate
List of rivers of North Rhine-Westphalia

References

Rivers of Rhineland-Palatinate
Rivers of North Rhine-Westphalia
Rivers of the Westerwald
Rivers of Germany